A caudillo (from Latin , diminutive of caput "head") is a type of personalist leader wielding military and political power. There is no precise English translation of caudillo, though it is often used interchangeably with "warlord" and "strongman". The term is historically associated with Spain, and with Hispanic America after virtually all of the region won independence in the early nineteenth century.

The roots of caudillismo may be tied to the framework of rule in medieval and early modern Spain during the Reconquest from the Moors. Spanish conquistadors such as Hernán Cortés and Francisco Pizarro exhibit characteristics of the caudillo, being successful military leaders, having mutual reliance of the leader and their supporters, and rewarding them for their loyalty. During the colonial era, the Spanish crown asserted its power and established a plethora of bureaucratic institutions that prevented personalist rule. Historian John Lynch argues that the rise of caudillos in Spanish America is rooted not in the distant Spanish past but in the immediate context of the Spanish American wars of independence. Those wars overthrew colonial rule and left a power vacuum in the early nineteenth century. Caudillos were very influential in the history of Spanish America and have a legacy that has influenced political movements in the modern era. The term is often used pejoratively by critics of a regime. However, Spain's General Francisco Franco (1936–1975) proudly took the title as his own during and after his military overthrow of the Second Spanish Republic in the Spanish Civil War (1936–39). Spanish censors during his rule attacked publishers who applied the term to Hispanic American strongmen. Caudillos''' exercise of power is a form considered authoritarian. Most societies have had personalist leaders at times, but Hispanic America has had many more, the majority of whom were not self-described caudillos. However, scholars have applied the term to a variety of Hispanic American leaders.

Spanish American Caudillos

Since Spanish American independence in the early nineteenth century, the region has been noted for its number of caudillos and the duration of their rule. The early nineteenth century is sometimes called "The Age of Caudillos", with Juan Manuel de Rosas, dictator of Argentina, and his contemporary in Mexico, Antonio López de Santa Anna, dominating national politics. Brazil's transition to independence was the establishment of the Brazilian Empire, which kept intact Brazil's geographical integrity and central authority. Weak nation-states in Spanish America fostered the continuation of caudillismo from the late nineteenth century into the twentieth century. The formation of Mexico's Institutional Revolutionary Party in 1929 effectively ended caudillismo. Men characterized as caudillos have ruled in Cuba (Gerardo Machado, Fulgencio Batista, Fidel Castro), Panama (Omar Torrijos, Manuel Noriega), the Dominican Republic (Desiderio Arias, Cipriano Bencosme), Paraguay (Alfredo Stroessner), Argentina (Juan Perón and other military strongmen), and Chile (Augusto Pinochet). Caudillos have been the subject of literature in Spanish America.

Hispanic America is not unique in having strong leaders emerge during times of turmoil. The cause of their emergence in Spanish America is generally seen to be in the destruction of the Spanish colonial state structure after the wars of independence, and in the importance of leaders from the independence struggles for providing government in the post-independence period, when nation-states came into being. Historian John Lynch states that "Before 1810 the caudillo was unknown. … The caudillo entered history as a local hero whom larger events promoted to a military chieftain." He gained in power by his success as a military leader. In a rural area that lacked any institutions of the state, and where the environment was one of violence and anarchy, a caudillo could impose order, often by using violence himself to achieve it. His local control as a strongman needed to be maintained by assuring the loyalty of his followers, so his bestowing material rewards reinforced his own position. Caudillos could also maintain their position by protecting the interests of regional elites. A local strongman who built a regional base could aspire to become a national caudillo, taking control of the state. In this situation, caudillos could bestow patronage on a large retinue of clients, who in turn gave him their loyalty. In general, caudillos power benefited elites. But these strongmen were also mediators between elites and the popular classes, recruiting them into the power base, but also restraining them from achieving power themselves.

There were a few strongmen, whom historian E. Bradford Burns has named "folk caudillos", who either rose from a humble background to protect the interests of indigenous groups or other rural marginalized groups, or strongly identified with those groups. In his analysis, these folk caudillos were in contrast to Europeanized elites who viewed the lower orders with contempt. He gives examples of Juan Facundo Quiroga, Martín Güemes and other Argentine caudillos, most importantly Juan Manuel de Rosas, who were popular and populist caudillos. Burns attributes the urban elites' bafflement and their contempt for followers of these folk caudillos for much of the negative role assigned to caudillos.

National caudillos often sought to legitimize their rule by holding titles of authority, such as "President of the Republic". If the constitution put formal limits on presidential power and term limits, caudillos could bend or break the rules to maintain power, a practice dubbed "continuismo".

Ideologically, caudillos could be either liberal or conservative. Liberalism had an advantage in the post-independence period, drawing on ideas of the liberators, and created the institutional frameworks of the new nation-states via written constitutions. Free trade as an economic policy created market-oriented economies. The model that these nation-states often adopted was federalism, keeping power in the component regions. Federalism, however, tended toward centrifugalism and fragmentation and were characterized by weak central governments. Conservative caudillos also emerged around 1830. New nation-states often rejected the institutions of the colonial era as legacies to be rejected, but the Roman Catholic Church and traditional values remained strong in many regions, supported by elites seeking to maintain their power in the new order. Conservative caudillos, supported by the Church and elites, moved to the creation of strong, central governments. In Argentina, Juan Manuel de Rosas and in Mexico, Antonio López de Santa Anna were exemplars of conservative authoritarian rule.

Independence era
The Spanish American wars of independence of the early nineteenth century disrupted Spain and the Spanish Empire, when in 1808 Napoleon Bonaparte invaded the Iberian Peninsula, overturned the Spanish Bourbon monarchy, and placed his brother Joseph on the Spanish throne. Bonaparte is an example of a successful general who rose to national power during the massive disruption of the French Revolution and was crowned emperor in 1804. For Spain and Spain's empire, their loss of legitimate monarch to a usurper unleashed forces that might well have remained latent. In Spanish America, the eighteenth-century Bourbon Reforms had systematically excluded American-born Spanish men or criollos from positions of political power, with the crown privileging Iberian-born officials and imposing economic policies that had deleterious effects in part of the empire. Previously, Spanish America had developed a level of local rule within the empire, with local elites being able to aspire to official positions and economic relations operated within long-established patterns. The Napoleonic invasion of Spain sparked Spanish American movements for autonomy and various regions set up juntas which operated in the name of the displaced Bourbon monarch. With the restoration of Ferdinand VII in 1814 following Napoleon's defeat and his reassertion of absolutist rule, the struggles in many parts of Spanish America became unequivocal wars of independence. Except for Cuba and Puerto Rico, Spanish America had achieved that goal by 1825.

Although there was the hope of some Spanish American leaders of independence that the political contours of regions would reconstitute the former viceroyalties, but with local autonomy. The Roman Catholic Church as an institution remained strong and the militaries that won victories against royalist forces. The state as an institution in most areas was weak. Conflicts over the form the new governments should take were rampant, and veterans of the wars of independence saw themselves as the leaders of the nation-states they had helped bring into being.

In the wake of the violence and political disruption, new nations were faced with widespread property destruction, disappearance of trade, and states that lacked political authority. The first few decades after independence saw the rise of strongmen with roots in the military. Spanish America had known no other type of regime than monarchy, and Mexico established one under royalist general-turned insurgent Agustín de Iturbide. Brazil's transition to independence was via the Brazilian Empire, which kept its territory intact, and was ruled by a legitimate monarch. In Spanish America, new sovereign states grappled with the question of balancing a central authority, usually in the hands of the traditional elites, with some kind of representation of the new "citizenry" of the republics. Constitutions were written laying out division of powers, but the rule of personalist strongmen, caudillos, dominated. Dictoratorial powers were granted to some caudillos, nominally ruling as presidents under a constitution, as "constitutional dictators".

Major leaders of the independence era

Early nineteenth-century Caudillos
There were a number of strongmen who went beyond raw struggles for power and its spoils and established "integrative dictatorships". These regimes attempted to curtail centrifugal forces, often termed "federalism", whereby regions or states of a nation-state had more autonomy, and instead to establish the hegemony of the central government. According to political scientist Peter H. Smith, these include Juan Manuel de Rosas in Argentina; Diego Portales of Chile, whose system lasted nearly a century; and Porfirio Díaz of Mexico. Rosas and Díaz were military men, who continued to rely on armed forces to maintain themselves in power.

 Mexico, Central America, and the Caribbean 

This region was vulnerable to stronger powers, particularly the United States as well as the United Kingdom. Cuba remained in the hands of the Spanish crown until 1898, and it could be a launching area for attempts to reconquer its former colonies. The United States seized a huge area of territory Mexico claimed. Britain attempted to set up a protectorate on the Mosquito Coast of Central America. The two strong men of this early century were Antonio López de Santa Anna in Mexico and Rafael Carrera in Guatemala.

Liberal Francisco Morazán is considered one of the most important figures in Central American independence and unity, alongside conservative José Cecilio del Valle. Morazán was recognised as a visionary and great thinker, as he enacted many liberal reforms in the Federal Republic of Central America, including freedom of the press, freedom of speech and freedom of religion, also limited church power by making marriage secular and abolishing government-aided tithing. Valle was a philosopher, politician, lawyer, and journalist who displayed a wide-ranging expertise in public administration management, and is recognised as a founding father of Central America.

Mexico began its revolt against Spain in 1810, gaining independence in 1821. Political divisions in the post-independence period were labeled Federalist, seeking a weak central government and often associated with liberalism, and Centralist, who sought a strong central state and defense of traditional institutional structures, particularly the Mexican Army and the Roman Catholic Church. Many regional strongmen were in the Federalist-Liberal camp, which supported local control and the continuation of their power. The quintessential Mexican caudillo, who gained national power for decades, was Santa Anna, who was initially a Liberal but became a Conservative and sought strengthening of the central government. Following the Mexican–American War, regional caudillos such as Juan Álvarez of the state of Guerrero and Santiago Vidaurri of Nuevo León-Coahuila ousted Santa Anna in the Revolution of Ayutla, bringing Liberals to power. General Juan Álvarez follows the pattern of the "folk caudillo, whom historian François Chevalier calls a "good cacique, [who] protected the mainly indigenous and mestizo peasants of Guerrero, who in turn gave him their loyalty. Álvarez briefly served as President of Mexico, returning to his home state, leaving ideological liberals to institute the era of La Reforma. During the era of the Mexican Reform and the French intervention in Mexico, there were a number of generals who had regional personal followings. Important figures whose local power had consequences nationally included Mariano Escobedo in San Luis Potosí; Ramón Corona in Jalisco and Durango, Porfirio Díaz in parts of Veracruz, Puebla, and Oaxaca. There were other caudillos whose power was more local but still important, including Gerónimo Treviño and Francisco Narajo in Nuevo León, Servando Canales and Juan Cortina in Tamaulipas, Florencio Antillón in Guanajuato, Ignacio Pesqueira in Sonora, Luis Terrazas in Chihuahua, and Manuel Lozada in Tepic. Following the defeat of the French in 1867, the government of Benito Juárez and his successor following his death, Sebastián Lerdo de Tejada faced opponents who objected to their increasingly Centralist administrations. Those opponents gravitated to supporting Porfirio Díaz, a military hero of the French intervention, who challenged Juárez and Lerdo by attempting rebellions, the second of which, the Plan of Tuxtepec, was successful in 1876. Juárez and Lerdo removed some caudillos from office, but this prompted them to rebel. These included Trinidad García de la Cadena in Zacatecas, Luis Mier y Terán in Veracruz, Juan Haro in Tampico, Juan N. Méndez in Puebla, Vicente Jiménez in Guerrero, and Juan Cortina in Matamoros. Their opposition to Lerdo brought them together. "That they slowly gathered around Porfirio Díaz is the story of the rise of Porfirian Mexico."

 Bolivarian republics: Bolivia, Colombia, Ecuador, Peru, and Venezuela 
Simón Bolívar, the foremost leader of independence in Spanish America, attempted to recreate the Viceroyalty of New Granada in the nation of Gran Colombia. As with other areas of Spanish America, centrifugal forces were at work so that despite the leadership of Bolívar, the country fragmented into separate nation-states. Bolivar saw the need for political stability, which could be put into effect with a president-for-life and the power to name his successor. In 1828 his supporters called on him to assume dictatorial powers and "save the republic". However, the political turmoil continued and Bolívar stepped down in 1830, going into self-imposed exile and dying shortly thereafter. "He is revered as the one person who made the greatest contribution to Spanish American independence" and admired by both the political Left, for opposing slavery and distrust of the U.S., and the Right, which admires his authoritarianism.

Veterans of the wars of independence assumed the leadership of the newly created nation-states, each with a new constitution. Despite constitutions and ideological labels of Liberal and Conservative, personalist and opportunistic leaders dominated the early nineteenth century. As with Mexico and Central America, the political turmoil and penury of the governments of the Bolivarian republics prevented foreign investors from risking their capital there.

One caudillo who was remarkably progressive for his time was Bolivia’s Manuel Isidoro Belzu. He served as Bolivia's fourteenth president from 1848 until 1855. The former president, Jose Miguel de Velasco, executed a coup for the presidency in 1848, promising the position of Minister of War to Belzu. Belzu, however, seized power for himself once the coup was completed, and cemented his position as president by quashing a counter-coup by Velasco. During his presidency, Belzu instituted several reforms to the country's economy in an effort to redistribute wealth more equitably. He rewarded the work of the poor and dispossessed. Like Paraguay’s Jose Gaspar Rodriguez de Francia, Belzu chose to enact the aforementioned welfare programs because the idea of communalism was more in tune with the traditional values of native populations than the emphasis on private property that other caudillos embraced. Belzu was also known for his nationalization of the country’s profitable mining industry – he enacted protectionist policies to reserve Bolivian resources for Bolivian use. Thus, provoking the ire of influential British as well as Peruvian and Chilean shipping and mining interests. Many of Belzu’s policies won him favor among the long-downtrodden indigenous peoples of Bolivia, but this came at the cost of enraging wealthy Creole Bolivians as well as foreign countries like Britain that sought to use resources from Bolivian mines. Belzu even took steps to legitimize his leadership, and was at one point democratically elected. Despite his popularity in many sectors, Belzu had many powerful enemies, which was shown by him surviving 40 assassination attempts. His enemies wanted to destroy the state-run projects that helped nationalist program but likewise improved the public sphere on which the country's poor were reliant. However, the despotism that is so rife among the caudillos also found a home with Belzu – from the early 1850s until his abdication of power in 1855, he is said to have ruled despotically, making himself very wealthy in the process. Belzu considered to come back to presidency in 1861, however, he was gunned down by one of his rivals by the time he tried to run for presidency again. He was unable to leave a legacy and his populist programs died with him. After Bolivia's independence, Bolivia lost half of its territory to neighboring countries including Argentina, Chile, Peru, and Brazil through the war and agreements reached under the threat of invasion.

Southern Cone: Argentina, Chile, Paraguay, and Uruguay
In contrast to most of Spanish America, post-independence Chile experienced political stability under the authoritarian rule of Conservatives, backed by the landowning class. Although he never sought the presidency, cabinet minister Diego Portales (1793–1837) is credited with creating a strong, centralized regime that lasted 30 years. In general Chile prospered with an export-oriented economy based on agriculture and mining, an exception to most of Spanish American regimes.

In the former viceroyalty of Río de la Plata, political instability and violence were more typical of the era. In Argentina, Juan Manuel de Rosas (r. 1829–1852) dominated the Argentine confederation. He came from a wealthy landowning family, but also acquired large tracts of land in Buenos Aires province. Rosas despised "the principles of political democracy and liberty [and] provided order in a region that had known near-anarchy since independence." This order came at the cost of severe repression of his enemies, using a variety of armed followers, most well known being the Mazorca. He had a popular following among the lower classes in Buenos Aires province.

During his two-decade reign, Rosas was able to rise to power and create an empire. He became the model for what a caudillo was supposed to be. He used his military experience to gain support from gauchos and estancias to create an army that would challenge the leadership of Argentina. After his rise to power using the rural workers, he changed his system in favor of using the military. He attempted to impose a ban on imported goods to help and win the support of the artisans in Argentina, but he failed. He was forced to lift the ban on certain imports, like textiles, which opened a trade with Great Britain. Through his power over the imports and exports, the military, the police, and even the legislative branch of government, Rosas created a monopoly that would ensure his remaining in power for over two decades; however there didn't ensure a peaceful twenty years. By the 1850s, Rosas was under attack by the very people who had helped him gain power. He was driven out of power and eventually ended up in Great Britain where he died in 1877.

Uruguay attained independence of Brazil and Argentina and was ruled by Fructuoso Rivera. In Paraguay, José Gaspar Rodríguez de Francia (r. 1814–1840) was Supreme Dictator of the Republic, maintaining the landlocked country's independence from Argentina and from foreign powers. Sealed off from outside trade, Paraguay developed economic self-sufficiency under Francia. He based society on communal properties, rather than centralized authoritarianism, attempting to revert to the methods of the communal Indian society that existed previously in Paraguay. After independence the state gained control of the land which was once under control of the Church and the Spanish state. Francia created state ranches and rented out land for the use of citizens who were able to pay a fee. Francia's repressive measures included crushing the power of the elite American-born Spaniards and curbing the power of the Roman Catholic Church. Francia allowed for religious freedom and abolished the tithe. He actively encouraged miscegenation. He has been a controversial figure in Hispanic American history, in an effort to aid the poor. Many modern historians credit him with bringing stability to Paraguay, preserving independence, and "bequeathing to his successors an egalitarian, homogeneous nation." However, because of his crackdown on the wealthy elite and the subsequent weakening of their power, he was accused of anti-clericalism. Nevertheless, Paraguay prospered under Francia in terms of economics and trade through a trade route with Buenos Aires, which was opposed by the wealthy Argentinian elites. "Sometimes counted among the dictators of the era, contemporary history has viewed Francia as an honest, populist leader who promoted sovereign economic prosperity in a war-torn Paraguay."

Gallery

Caudillos in the late nineteenth and twentieth centuries
In the late nineteenth century, regimes in Spanish America were more stable and often less dominated by military men. Foreign investors, particularly the British, began building infrastructure in countries of greatest interest to the UK's economic needs. Such projects included railways, telegraph lines, and port facilities, which cut transportation time and costs and sped up communications. Stable political regimes that could ensure the security of foreign investments, facilitate extraction of resources, and production of agricultural crops and animals were the necessary structures. Industrialization also took hold in a few countries (Mexico, Argentina, Colombia) to produce consumer goods locally. In general, foreign governments and entrepreneurs had no interest in directly administering countries of Hispanic America in a formal colonial arrangement so long as their interests could be nurtured by modernizing national governments, often seen as neocolonialism. There are a number of examples of continuismo in Hispanic America whereby presidents continue in office beyond the legal term limits, with constitutional revision, plebiscites, and the creation of family dynasties, such as the Somoza family in Nicaragua.

Mexico

A major example of a modernizing caudillo of the late nineteenth century is General Porfirio Díaz (r. 1876–1911), whose period of control is known as the Porfiriato. His slogan was “order and progress,” which was enforced by armed men controlled by the president, the Rurales. Díaz was averse to being dependent on the Mexican army, since as a general and leader of a coup d'état himself, he knew their potential for intervening in national politics. Díaz coopted or crushed regional opposition to his regime, creating a political machine to forward his vision of modern Mexico. Desirous of economic development that necessitated foreign investment, Díaz sought capital and expertise from European powers (Britain, France, and Germany) to offset the closer power of the United States. Although elections were held in Mexico at regular intervals, they were by nature not democratic. The huge rural, illiterate, and mostly indigenous populations were more to be feared by the government than as a source for regime support. When Díaz failed to find a political solution to his succession, the Mexican Revolution erupted after the fraudulent 1910 general election.

Diaz came to power by a coup under the Plan of Tuxtepec and became president of Mexico 1876–1880, succeeded by his military and political compadre Manuel González (1880–1884) and returned to the presidency until he was overthrown in 1911 in the Mexican Revolution.

During that decade-long civil war, a number of regional caudillos arose. Pascual Orozco helped oust Díaz at the early stage of the Revolution, but then turned against Francisco I. Madero, who had been elected to the presidency in 1911. Pancho Villa also helped oust Díaz, supported Madero, and following his murder in 1913, became a general in the Constitutionalist Army commanded by civilian Venustiano Carranza. Emiliano Zapata, peasant leader from the state of Morelos, opposed to Díaz and every subsequent Mexican government until his murder in 1919 by agents of Carranza. Álvaro Obregón emerged as another brilliant general from northern Mexico, defeating Villa's Division of the North in 1915 after Villa had broken with Carranza. Obregón and fellow Sonoran generals Plutarco Elías Calles and Adolfo de la Huerta overthrew Carranza in 1920 under the Plan of Agua Prieta, with the presidency in the 1920s going in turn from de la Huerta, to Obregón, to Calles, and back to Obregón. During Calles's presidency (1924–28), he stringently enforced the anticlerical laws of the Mexican Constitution of 1917, leading to the Cristero War, a failed major uprising under the leadership of some regional caudillos, including Saturnino Cedillo of San Luis Potosí. Obregón was elected again in 1928, but was assassinated before he could again resume the presidency. In 1929, Plutarco Elías Calles founded a political party, then known as the Partido Nacional Revolucionario (PNR), and became the "Jefe Máximo" (maximum chief), being the power behind the presidency in a period known as the Maximato (1928–1934); PNR's iteration as the Institutional Revolutionary Party dominated Mexican politics until 2000 and functioned as a brake on the personalist power of regional caudillos in Mexico.Julia C. Girouard, "Caudillismo" in Encyclopedia of Mexico, vol. 1, p. 229. Chicago: Fitzroy Dearborn 1997.

Central America
With the improvement of transportation, tropical products such as coffee and bananas could be transported to a growing consumer market in the United States. In Guatemala Justo Rufino Barrios ruled as a Liberal autocrat and expanded coffee cultivation. In El Salvador, Santiago González took power in 1871 and established Liberal dominance until 1944. In Nicaragua José Santos Zelaya ousted Conservatives in 1893 and embarked on agricultural exports and infrastructure projects. He later became hostile to the United States, which helped oust him in 1909. With the incorporation of the United Fruit Company in the U.S. in 1899, the company's presence in Hispanic America expanded especially in Costa Rica, Guatemala, Colombia, and Cuba.

In twentieth-century Nicaragua, the capitalist strongman Anastasio Somoza García held the presidential office and then was succeeded by his son Anastasio Somoza Debayle, establishing a political dynasty. A notoriously brutal dictatorship, it was supported by the United States as a means to maintain political stability in the region and shore up U.S. business interests. The Somoza dynasty was overthrown in the Sandinista Revolution in 1979.

Caribbean
Cuba was a colony of Spain until the Spanish–American War (1898), so that caudillos arose to power only in the twentieth century. Gerardo Machado and Fulgencio Batista had their roots in the Cuban military. Machado ran for re-election in 1928 despite a promise to only serve one term as president, and became increasingly repressive against his critics, many who were killed by the police. Machado was overthrown in 1933 by the Sergeants' Revolt that saw Batista rise to prominence. Batista appointed himself head of the armed forces, ruled through puppet presidents and was elected president in 1940. After failing to be re-elected in 1952, Batista launched a coup, installing a right-wing dictatorship where American business interests, landowners, and the Cuban elite were favored. Under Batista, hundreds to 4,000 Cubans were killed by the army, police, Rural Guard and anti-communist secret police, with many more fleeing into exile.Guerra, Lillian (2012). Visions of Power in Cuba: Revolution, Redemption, and Resistance, 1959–1971. Chapel Hill: University of North Carolina Press. p. 42 "The likely total was probably closer to three to four thousand." Batista's right-wing dictatorship was overthrown in 1959 by Fidel Castro, Raúl Castro, Che Guevara, Camilo Cienfuegos, and their left-wing nationalist 26th of July Movement. After worsening relations with the US culminated in the Bay of Pigs Invasion in 1961, Fidel declared himself a communist and established an authoritarian Marxist-Leninist state. Fidel's brother Raúl succeeded as leader in 2011 when Fidel was too ill to remain in power. This kind of dynastic succession is an example of continuismo.

In the Dominican Republic, Rafael Trujillo came to power in 1930, ruling for over 31 years as an unchallenged military strongmen, either by himself or through puppet presidents. Trujillo established a personality cult, extended his policy of state terrorism into neighboring countries, the US and Central America, and ordered the Parsley massacre where tens of thousands of Haitians were killed by Dominican troops.

Bolivarian republics

Southern Cone
Argentina has experienced a long history of caudillismo. In the twentieth century, Juan Perón and his dynamic and charismatic wife, Evita Perón, held power. One historian has speculated whether Evita Perón can be considered a caudilla. With Eva's death in 1952 from cancer, Perón fell from power and went into exile. He returned to power with his third wife Isabel Perón, whom he made vice president. With his death, she succeeded to power but was later overthrown by the Argentine military.

Today, the term caudillo is still used in Argentina as a negative term to describe very powerful provincial governors, who might perpetuate themselves in power for decades and engage in corruption, particularly misappropriation of public funds. They also tend to practice nepotism. Some of the most powerful governors who have been called caudillos are Gildo Insfran, governor of Formosa from 1995 to the present, and Carlos Juárez in Santiago del Estero.

In the late nineteenth and twentieth centuries, Chile had a significant period of civilian, constitutional rule. With the election of socialist Salvador Allende, the Chilean Army with the support of the U.S. government overthrew him by coup on September 11, 1973, and General Augusto Pinochet assumed power. Pinochet attempted to remain in power via constitutional means and staged a plebiscite in 1988 to get popular support. The plebiscite failed to provide a mandate and Chile entered a period of transition to democracy.

Paraguay was ruled by General Alfredo Stroessner from 1954 to 1989 and was ousted by military coup in 1989.

Gallery

Caudillos of former sovereign states
South America

The Republic of Entre Ríos was a short-lived state comprising what are today the Argentine provinces of Entre Ríos and Corrientes. It was founded on 29 September 1820 by General Francisco Ramírez (who styled himself jefe supremo, supreme chief) and lasted only one year. In spite of the "Republic" in its title, Ramirez never really intended to declare an independent Entre Rios. Rather, he was making a political statement in opposition to the monarchist and unitarian ideas that back then permeated Buenos Aires' politics. Ramírez was killed on 10 July 1821 after an unsuccessful attempt at saving his wife from captivity, and on 28 September the republic was dissolved.

The Free Province of Guayaquil was the predecessor state of Ecuador that emerged as a result of the Revolution of October 9, led mainly by José Joaquín de Olmedo. The state lasted until 31 July 1822, when, after the Guayaquil Conference, Simón Bolívar staged a coup d'état, which forcefully annexed the state to Gran Colombia. Its successor was the Guayaquil Department, which later would gain independence as Ecuador on 13 May 1830, under Juan José Flores.

 Central America 
The State of Los Altos was a secessionist state founded mostly by Guatemalan liberals, seeking independence from the conservative regime in Guatemala, led by Mariano Rivera Paz, and later Rafael Carrera. The state was supported by the Federal Republic of Central America (later only El Salvador and Honduras), and was even officially made the sixth state within the Federal Republic, until it was invaded and re-incorporated within Guatemala in 1840. The most important figure in Los Altan independence was General Agustín Guzmán, a supporter of Francisco Morazán, who originally attempted to defend Los Altos from the Guatemalan invasion, and later was the main leader of secessionist revolts in the 1840s. Guzmán died of wounds after an unsuccessful occupation of Guatemala City in October 1849.

The Free State of the Isthmus was a short-lived independent state located in present day Panama. The state was created after a popular meeting on 18 November 1840 with General Tomás de Herrera as president, but the state was only recognised by the United States and Costa Rica and only lasted about 13 months. Herrera originally fought against an independence movement in Panama led by Juan Eligio Alzuru and was appointed Colonel Commandant General of the Isthmus of Panama.

 Caribbean 
The Independent Republic of Spanish Haiti was the state that resulted from the defeat of Spanish royalists from Santo Domingo on 9 November 1821, led by General José Núñez de Cáceres. Haitian president Jean-Pierre Boyer had been preparing for a rumored invasion by French and Spanish troops, so when the independence of Spanish Haiti was declared on 1 December Boyer began do send emissaries to the central and northern parts of the republic to promote its annexation, and some cities began to fly the Haitian flag on public buildings and plazas. Originally the government was in favour of joining Gran Colombia, but some officials were persuaded into uniting with Haiti, which idea was more liked by the populous. By 1822 many cities had already agreed to annexation by Haiti, and on 9 February Boyer formally entered the capital city, Santo Domingo, where it's full annexation was recognised and the republic was dissolved.

The Republic of Puerto Rico was the name of the revolting state during the "Grito de Lares". The revolt was originally planned by Ramón Emeterio Betances and Segundo Ruiz Belvis, but Belvis died before the revolt was initiated. The republic was declared on 28 September 1868 in the town of Lares, with Francisco Ramírez Medina as president, but the revolt itself was headed by Manuel Rojas Luzardo. After an unsuccessful attempt at taking San Sebastián del Pepino, the rebels returned to Lares, where they were arrested by Puerto Rican militia. The revolt ended, and the republic was dissolved.

Gallery

Caudillos in literature
Fictional Hispanic American caudillos, sometimes based on real historical figures, are important in literature. Colombian Nobel Prize winner Gabriel García Márquez published two works with strongmen as main characters, The Autumn of the Patriarch and The General in his Labyrinth, a controversial novel about Simón Bolívar. In 1946, Nobel Prize laureate Miguel Ángel Asturias published El Señor Presidente, based on the life of Manuel Estrada Cabrera (1898–1920), which was translated to English in 1975. Augusto Roa Bastos published a novel based on the life of Paraguayan caudillo Dr. Francia. In Mexico, two fictional caudillos are depicted by Mariano Azuela's 1916 novel Los de Abajo and Carlos Fuentes's novel The Death of Artemio Cruz. Mexican writer Martín Luis Guzmán published in 1929 his novel La sombra del caudillo, a powerful critic of such strongmen. An outlier in terms of subject matter is Rómulo Gallegos's Doña Bárbara, depicting a woman caudillo.

See also
 List of Caudillos
 Caesarism
 Cult of personality
 Great man theory
 Leaderism
 Conducător
 Caciquismo and Caudillismo

Cited sources

References
 pi p

Further reading
Definitions, theories, and contexts

Alexander, Robert J. "Caudillos, Coroneis, and Political Bosses in Latin America." In Presidential Power in Latin American Politics, ed. Thomas V. DiBacco. New York: Prager 1977.
Beezley, William H. "Caudillismo: An Interpretative Note." Journal of Inter-American Studies 11 (July 1969): 345–52.
Collier, David, ed. The New Authoritarianism in Latin America. Princeton: Princeton University Press 1979.
 Dealy, Glenn Cudill. The Public Man: An Interpretation of Latin America and other Catholic Countries. Amherst: University of Massachusetts Press 1977.
 
DiTella, Torcuato S. Latin American Politics: A Theoretical Framework. Austin: University of Texas Press 1989.
Hale, Charles A. "The Reconstruction of Nineteenth-Century Politics in Spanish America: A Case for the History of Ideas." Latin American Research Review 8 (Summer 1973), 53–73.
Hamill, Hugh, ed. Caudillos: Dictators in Spanish America. Norman: University of Oklahoma Press 1992.
Humphreys, R.A. "The Caudillo Tradition." in Tradition and Revolt in Latin America, 216–28. New York: Columbia University Press 1969.
 Johnson, John J. "Foreign Factors in Dictatorship in Latin America". Pacific Historical Review 20 (1951)
Kern, Robert, ed. The Caciques: Oligarchical Politics and the System of Caciquismo in the Luso-Hispanic World. Albuquerque: University of New Mexico Press 1973.
 Loveman, Brian. The Constitution of Tyranny: Regimes of Exception in Spanish America. Pittsburgh: University of Pittsburgh Press 1993.
 Lynch, John, Caudillos in Spanish America, 1800–1850. Oxford: Oxford University Press 1992.
Pleasants, Edwin Hemingway, The Caudillo: a Study in Latin-American Dictatorships. Monmouth, IL: Commercial Art Press 1959.
 Smith, Peter H. "Political Legitimacy in Spanish America" in New Approaches to Latin American History, Richard Graham and Peter Smith, eds. 1974.
Wolf, Eric R. and Edward C. Hanson, "Caudillo Politics: A Structural Analysis." Comparative Studies in Society and History 9 (1966–67): 168–79.

Regions and individuals

 Balfour, Sebastian (1990). Castro.
 Brading, D.A., ed. Caudillo and Peasant in the Mexican Revolution. Cambridge: Cambridge University Press 1980.
 Gilmore, Robert L. Caudillism and Militarism in Venezuela, 1810–1910. 1994.
 Haigh, Roger M. Martin Güemes: Tyrant or Tool? A Study of the Sources of Power of an Argentine Caudillo. 1968.
 Hamill, Hugh M., ed. Caudillos: Dictators in Spanish America. Selections on Hidalgo, Quiroga, Moreno, Díaz, Trujillo, Perón, Castro, Pinochet, and Stroessner. Norman: University of Oklahoma Press 1992.
 Lynch, John. "Bolívar and the Caudillos". Hispanic American Historical Review 63 No. 1 (1983), 3–35.
 Lynch, John. Argentine Dictator: Juan Manuel de Rosas, 1829–1852. 1981.
 Lynch, John. Caudillos in Spanish America, 1800–1850. Chapters on Rosas, Páez, Santa Anna, and Carrera. Oxford: Clarendon Press 1992.
 Page, Joseph A. Perón: A Biography. 1983.
 Park, James William. Rafael Núñez and the Politics of Colombian Regionalism, 1863–1886. (1985)
 Smith, Peter H. Democracy in Latin America: Political Change in Comparative Perspective. New York: Oxford University Press 2005.
 Wiarda, Howard. Dictatorship and Development: The Methods of Control in Trujillo's Dominican Republic. 1968.
 
 
 Woodward, Ralph Lee. Rafael Carrera and the Emergence of the Republic of Guatemala, 1821–1871. 1993.

19th-century rulers in North America
Argentine Civil War
Authoritarianism
Coups d'état
Dictatorship
Francoist Spain
History of North America
History of South America
History of the Americas
Military personnel
Populism
Spanish American wars of independence
Spanish language
Titles of national or ethnic leadership